Sekolah Dyatmika is a bilingual (English/Indonesian) school located just north of the Sanur region of Bali, Indonesia.

References

External links
 Official site

Educational institutions established in 1996
1996 establishments in Indonesia
Schools in Bali
Bilingual schools
Schools in Indonesia